Upendra Singh Rawat is an Indian politician and is a member of the Bharatiya Janata Party. In 2019 General election he was the candidate from Barabanki constituency of Uttar Pradesh and he won the election with 535594 votes against the Samajwadi Party candidate Ram Sagar Rawat

Positions held

Attendance details of Upendra Singh Rawat (93% Attendance)

Debates (Participated in 5 Debate)

Questions details of Upendra Singh Rawat (68 questions asked)

References

India MPs 2019–present
Bharatiya Janata Party politicians from Uttar Pradesh
Uttar Pradesh politicians
Living people
1969 births